1979 in Korea may refer to:
1979 in North Korea
1979 in South Korea